Atriplex coulteri is a species of saltbush known by the common names Coulter's saltbush and Coulter's orache.

It is native to coastal southern California and northern Baja California, where it is quite rare. It grows in areas of saline and alkaline soils, such as ocean bluffs.

This is a perennial herb producing leaning or erect reddish green stems and branches generally under 50 centimeters tall. The gray scaly leaves are no bigger than 2 centimeters long and are oval in shape. The plant has male and female inflorescences which are small hard clusters of flowers. The brown seeds are under 2 millimeters wide.

External links
Jepson Manual Treatment
USDA Plants Profile
Flora of North America
Photo gallery

coulteri
Halophytes
Flora of Baja California
Flora of California
Natural history of the California chaparral and woodlands
Natural history of the Channel Islands of California
Flora without expected TNC conservation status